John Francis McCarthy (February 18, 1924  February 21, 1981) was a Republican member of the California Senate. Before he was in California's legislature, he was a merchant marine during the Second World War. He entered office in 1950 as a nonpartisan senator before turning Republican in 1952. He was the Senate's Minority Leader from 1967 until his retirement in 1971. During his tenure, he created and passed a bill for the formation of the Bay Area Rapid Transit (BART) in 1957. He was a strong advocate of free speech, and believed that a university is like a fourth branch of government.
A lifelong resident of the San Francisco Bay Area, McCarthy represented State Senate District 13 from 1951 to 1967, and District 4 in his final term (19671971). He was born in San Francisco and died in the suburb of Tiburon. He had 7 children.

The Richmond-San Rafael Bridge was named in his honor.

His elder brother, Democrat Robert I. McCarthy served in the State Assembly from 1948 to 1952 and Senate from 1954 to 1958.

References
joinCalifornia: Election History of California- John F. "Jack" McCarthy

Notes

1924 births
1981 deaths
Republican Party California state senators
Politicians from San Francisco
20th-century American politicians
People from Tiburon, California
United States Merchant Mariners of World War II